Herbert James Linnell (7 March 1909 – 8 February 1968) was an English first-class cricketer and educator.

Linnell was born at Paddington in March 1909. He was educated at St. Lawrence College, Ramsgate before going up to Trinity College, Oxford. While studying at Oxford, he played first-class cricket for Oxford University, making his debut against Middlesex at Oxford in 1929. He next played for Oxford in 1932, making three appearances, including against the touring Indians. Playing as a right-arm fast bowler, he took 8 wickets at an average of 38.75 and best figures of 4 for 57. 

After graduating from Oxford, he became a schoolteacher. He taught at Repton School during the 1930s. He served as a lieutenant with the Sherwood Foresters during the Second World War. Linnell died in hospital at Canterbury in February 1968.

References

External links

1909 births
1968 deaths
People from Paddington
People educated at St Lawrence College, Ramsgate
Alumni of Trinity College, Oxford
English cricketers
Oxford University cricketers
Schoolteachers from Derbyshire
Sherwood Foresters officers
British Army personnel of World War II